The Western Michigan Broncos women's basketball team represents Western Michigan University, in Kalamazoo, Michigan in women's basketball. The school competes in the Mid-American Conference in Division I of the National Collegiate Athletic Association (NCAA). The Broncos play home basketball games at the University Arena near the campus in Kalamazoo, Michigan.

Season-by-season record
Western Michigan has a 610–677 record since starting play in 1967 with a 266–306 record in Mid-American Conference play. They have won the MAC tournament (1985, 2003) while being the tournament runner-up in 1988, and the Broncos have won a division title (2000) as well. While they haven't advanced past the First Round of the NCAA Tournament, they have qualified for the Women's National Invitation Tournament (WNIT) four times (1999, 2000, 2004, 2015) and advanced to the Quarterfinals in 2004.

NCAA tournament results

References

External links